Rhagovelia choreutes is a species in the infraorder Gerromorpha ("semiaquatic bugs"), in the order Hemiptera ("true bugs, cicadas, hoppers, aphids and allies").
The distribution range of Rhagovelia choreutes includes Central America and North America.

References

Further reading
 Arnett, Ross H. (2000). American Insects: A Handbook of the Insects of America North of Mexico. CRC Press.
 Bacon, John A. (1956). "A Taxonomic Study of the Genus Rhagovelia (Hemiptera, Veliidae) of the Western Hemisphere". The University of Kansas Science Bulletin, vol. 38, pt. 1, no. 10, 695-913.
 Henry, Thomas J., and Richard C. Froeschner, eds. (1988). Catalog of the Heteroptera, or True Bugs, of Canada and the Continental United States, xix + 958.
 Polhemus, Dan A. (1997). "Systematics of the Genus Rhagovelia Mayr (Heteroptera: Veliidae) in the Western Hemisphere (Exclusive of the angustipes Complex)". Thomas Say Publications in Entomology: Monographs, ii + 386.
 Stevens, Lawrence E., and John T. Polhemus (2008). "Biogeography Of aquatic and semiaquatic Heteroptera in the Grand Canyon ecoregion, wouthwestern USA". Monographs of the Western North American Naturalist, vol. 4, no. 1, 38-76.
 Thomas J. Henry, Richard C. Froeschner. (1988). Catalog of the Heteroptera, True Bugs of Canada and the Continental United States. Brill Academic Publishers.

Veliidae
Insects described in 1925